Īhāia Hūtana ( – 9 November 1938) was a New Zealand tribal leader, newspaper editor and assessor. Of Māori descent, he identified with the Ngāti Kahungunu iwi. He was born in Poroutawhao, Manawatu/Horowhenua, New Zealand, in about 1844.

References

1844 births
1938 deaths
New Zealand writers
People from Manawatū-Whanganui
Ngāti Kahungunu people
New Zealand Māori writers
New Zealand Māori public servants